Winfield Scott Angus (January 10, 1896 – May 10, 1977) was an American football and basketball coach.  He was the seventh head football coach at Eastern Illinois State Teachers College—now known as Eastern Illinois University—in Charleston, Illinois, serving for one season, in 1935, and compiling a record of 1–7.  Angus was also the head basketball coach at Eastern Illinois for the 1935–36 season, tallying a mark of 7–12.

Head coaching record

Football

References

1896 births
1977 deaths
Basketball coaches from New Jersey
Eastern Illinois Panthers football coaches
Eastern Illinois Panthers men's basketball coaches
Sportspeople from Hoboken, New Jersey